Pablo Larrazábal Corominas (born 15 May 1983) is a Spanish professional golfer who plays on the European Tour. He also played in the inaugural LIV Golf Invitational Series event at the Centurion Club.

Early life
Larrazábal was born in Barcelona, Spain. He attended high school in the United States and returned to Spain in 2002 with the intention of turning professional but his father made him work on the family fish farm in Cantabria to understand the value of money. He eventually turned professional in 2004.

His older brother Alejandro Larrazábal won The Amateur Championship in 2002, with the teenage Pablo acting as caddy; their Venezuelan father Gustavo and Catalan mother Elena both played golf to a high standard.

Professional career

2006–2007: Challenge Tour
Larrazábal played in 8 events on the Challenge Tour in 2006 and made 7 cuts. His best finish came at the Vodafone Challenge where he was tied for seventh, his only top ten finish of the year. He earned €7,160 on the year and finished 138th on the money list.

Larrazábal played in 17 events in 2007 and made 10 cuts while recording two top 10 finishes and six top 25 finishes. His best finish came at the Postbank Challenge where he finished in fourth. He earned €21,596 on the year and finished 69th on the money list. Larrazábal finished in a tie for sixth at Q-School and earned his card for the European Tour's 2008 season.

2008: Rookie of the Year and first European Tour title
In his rookie season on tour, Larrazábal played in 28 events and made 17 cuts. Larrazábal won his first title on the European Tour at the Open de France where he led after all four rounds. He also had an impressive finish at the Madrid Masters where he finished in third. Larrazábal recorded three top 10 finishes and 7 top 25 finishes. He finished in 18th on the Order of Merit, earning €960,858. This propelled him to the Sir Henry Cotton Rookie of the Year award.

2009–2010: Inconsistency and struggle for form
Larrazábal had an inconsistent year in 2009 on the European Tour, with only a single top ten finish, and three top 25 finishes. He finished ranked 86th on the inaugural Race to Dubai. The following season was not much better for Larrazábal, making 18 of 31 cuts and finishing in the top ten on three occasions. He earned €332,500 in the 2010 season and finished 88th in the Race to Dubai standings.

2011: Improved form and second European Tour win
Larrazábal started the 2011 season with a fifth-place finish in India at the Avantha Masters before finishing third in his home country's national tournament, the Open de España finishing three strokes behind the winner Thomas Aiken. A month later he finished fourth at the Saab Wales Open shooting a 67 during the final round to move through the field and into the top five. In June 2011, Larrazábal won his second European Tour title at the BMW International Open in Munich beating compatriot Sergio García in a sudden death playoff. Both men entered the final round trailing by two strokes, but fired rounds of 68 to finish on sixteen under par. Larrazábal had a putt to win outright at the 72nd hole but that slipped by, allowing García to birdie the last to take them into a playoff. After both players made birdies at the 18th, on the first and second playoff holes, they advanced to the par three 12th and the par three 17th, where Larrazábal let two more ten footers slide by for the championship. However at the fifth extra hole, the par five 18th, García ran his eagle putt four feet past, with Larrazábal two feet away in three. García's birdie putt then lipped out and Larrazábal holed out for victory.

This win came three weeks after Larrazábal had missed out in a playoff himself in an Open Championship qualifier at Sunningdale, but the win has ensured himself of a place at the 2011 Open Championship at Royal St. George's. Larrazábal ended the season ranked 17th on the Race to Dubai, his highest finish to date.

2012
Larrazábals best finishes in 2012 were a pair of tied for second places: at the Reale Seguros Open de España in May and at the KLM Open in September.

2014
In January 2014, Larrazábal won the Abu Dhabi HSBC Golf Championship by one stroke over Rory McIlroy and Phil Mickelson. In a bizarre incident in April, Larrazábal was attacked by a swarm of hornets during the second round of the Maybank Malaysian Open and resorted to jumping into a lake to escape. He received around 20 stings, but still managed to card a round of 68.

2015

In June 2015, Larrazábal won his second BMW International Open in Germany. This was his fourth career title on the European Tour.

2019
In December, Larrazábal won the Alfred Dunhill Championship at Leopard Creek Country Club in South Africa by one stroke over Joel Sjöholm. This event was co-sanctioned by the European Tour and the Sunshine Tour.

2022
Larrazábal claimed his sixth European Tour victory in March at the MyGolfLife Open in South Africa. He beat Jordan Smith with a birdie at the second extra hole of a playoff after Adri Arnaus had been eliminated on the first playoff hole. A month later, at the ISPS Handa Championship in Spain, Larrazábal shot a final-round 62 to win by one shot ahead of Adrián Otaegui. It was his seventh European Tour win.

Professional wins (8)

European Tour wins (7)

1Co-sanctioned by the Sunshine Tour

European Tour playoff record (2–1)

Alps Tour wins (1)

Results in major championships
Results not in chronological order in 2020.

CUT = missed the half-way cut
"T" = tied
NT = No tournament due to COVID-19 pandemic

Summary

Most consecutive cuts made – 3 (2011 Open Championship – 2012 Open Championship)
Longest streak of top-10s – 0

Results in World Golf Championships
Results not in chronological order before 2015.

1Cancelled due to COVID-19 pandemic

QF, R16, R32, R64 = Round in which player lost in match play
NT = no tournament
"T" = tied
Note that the HSBC Champions did not become a WGC event until 2009.

Team appearances
Amateur
Eisenhower Trophy (representing Spain): 2000
European Boys' Team Championship (representing Spain): 2001
 European Youths' Team Championship (representing Spain): 2002

Professional
World Cup (representing Spain): 2008
Royal Trophy (representing Europe): 2009
Seve Trophy (representing Continental Europe): 2011
EurAsia Cup (representing Europe): 2014

See also
2007 European Tour Qualifying School graduates

References

External links

Spanish male golfers
Golfers from Catalonia
Golfers from Cantabria
European Tour golfers
LIV Golf players
Sportspeople from Barcelona
Spanish people of Venezuelan descent
Sportspeople of Venezuelan descent
Spanish people of Basque descent
1983 births
Living people
20th-century Spanish people
21st-century Spanish people